Eddie Lyons (November 25, 1886 – August 30, 1926) was an American film actor, director, writer, and producer of the silent era.  He appeared in 388, directed 153, wrote for 93, and produced 40 films between 1911 and 1926. He was born in Beardstown, Illinois, and died in Pasadena, California. Lyons was often paired with actor Lee Moran and the two made several comedic films together.

Lyons performed in vaudeville and acted in stock theater companies in Chicago before he began acting in films. He worked for the Nestor Film Company, first as an actor and then as director of one of the company's units. His brother, Harry Lyons, also was an actor.

Lyons married actress Virginia Kirtley in 1916, and they had a daughter, Frances Lyons, who was an actress.

On August 30, 1926, Lyons died in the Bishop Sanitarium in Pasadena, California, aged 40.

Selected filmography

 The Villain Foiled (1911)
 Mrs. Matthews, Dressmaker (1912)
 Jim's Atonement (1912)
 Almost a Rescue (1913)
 An Elephant on His Hands (1913)
 By the Sun's Rays (1914)
 When Lizzie Got Her Polish (1914)
 Wanted: A Leading Lady (1915)
 Their Quiet Honeymoon (1915)
 Where the Heather Blooms (1915)
 Love and a Savage (1915)
 Some Chaperone (1915)
 Jed's Trip to the Fair (1916)
 A Shocking Night (1921)
 Déclassée (1925)
 The Lodge in the Wilderness (1926)
 Shadow of the Law (1926)

References

External links

1886 births
1926 deaths
American male film actors
American male silent film actors
American male screenwriters
Film producers from Illinois
20th-century American male actors
People from Beardstown, Illinois
Male actors from Illinois
Articles containing video clips
Film directors from Illinois
Screenwriters from Illinois
20th-century American male writers
20th-century American screenwriters
American male stage actors
Vaudeville performers